Heller's serotine (Afronycteris helios), formerly known as Heller's pipistrelle, is a species of vesper bat. It is only found in Kenya, Somalia, Tanzania, and Uganda.

References

Afronycteris
Taxonomy articles created by Polbot
Mammals described in 1912
Taxobox binomials not recognized by IUCN